The Naughtiest Girl Keeps a Secret (1999) is the first of a continuation of Enid Blyton's The Naughtiest Girl series by Anne Digby. The series follows four books first written by Enid Blyton in the 1940s, continuing Elizabeth Allen's adventures at Whyteleafe School. Elizabeth is still in the first form.
The Naughtiest Girl Keeps a Secret is about Elizabeth's struggle to keep friend John's secret about planning to win a local gardening competition.

1999 British novels
British children's novels
English novels
Novels set in boarding schools
Hodder & Stoughton books
1999 children's books